René Barbier (4 March 1891 – 14 February 1966) was a French fencer. He won a silver medal in the team épée event at the 1928 Summer Olympics.

References

External links
 

1891 births
1966 deaths
French male épée fencers
Olympic fencers of France
Fencers at the 1928 Summer Olympics
Olympic silver medalists for France
Olympic medalists in fencing
Sportspeople from Lyon
Medalists at the 1928 Summer Olympics
20th-century French people